The tables list the Malayalam films released in theaters in the year 2014.

Released films

Dubbed films

References

2014
2014
Malayalam
Malayalam